is a Japanese football player who currently plays for St. Lucia FC in Malta.

Playing career
Handa was born in Yamaguchi on January 10, 1996. After graduating from high school, he moved to Montenegro and joined OFK Grbalj in 2014. In September 2015, he returned to Japan and joined J3 League club SC Sagamihara. In 2017, he moved to Regional Leagues club FC Kariya. He left the club in June 2017.

On 26 January 2019 it was confirmed, that Handa had joined St. Lucia FC in Malta.

References

External links

Yuki Handa at ZeroZero
Yuki Handa at MFA

1996 births
Living people
Association football people from Yamaguchi Prefecture
Japanese footballers
J3 League players
SC Sagamihara players
FC Kariya players
Association football midfielders